Green College may refer to:

 Green College, Oxford
 Green College, University of British Columbia